Alton Zitha Kwinika (born 4 January 1994) is a South African soccer player who plays as a defender for South African Premier Division side Kaizer Chiefs.

Early life
Macheke was born in Meadowlands.

Club career
He started his career at Kaizer Chiefs, and was promoted to their first team in 2014. He joined Chippa United on a season-long loan in summer 2015, before joining the club on a two-year deal after his contract at Chiefs expired in 2016. He joined Thanda Royal Zulu on loan for the 2016–17 season. He joined Bidvest Wits in July 2019, and made 24 appearances for the club, before signing for Stellenbosch in summer 2020. At the end of the 2021/22 season, he was named as Stellenbosch FC's Footballer of the Year and Players' Player of the Year before completing a return to boyhood club, Kaizer Chiefs.

International career
He has represented South Africa at under-23 level, playing at the 2015 Africa U-23 Cup of Nations.

References

Living people
1994 births
South African soccer players
People from Meadowlands, Gauteng
Sportspeople from Gauteng
Association football defenders
Kaizer Chiefs F.C. players
Chippa United F.C. players
Thanda Royal Zulu F.C. players
Bidvest Wits F.C. players
Stellenbosch F.C. players
South African Premier Division players
National First Division players
South Africa youth international soccer players
2015 Africa U-23 Cup of Nations players